Eremophila flabellata is a flowering plant in the figwort family, Scrophulariaceae and is endemic to Western Australia. It is a small shrub with serrated leaves, broad serrated sepals and pink, purple or mauve flowers.

Description

The petals are pink to mauve or purple on the outside and white inside the tube. The outer surface of the petal tube is hairy, but the inner surface of the petal lobes is glabrous while the inside of the tube is full of woolly hairs. The 4 stamens are fully enclosed in the petal tube.

Taxonomy and naming
Eremophila flabellata was first formally described by Robert Chinnock in 2007 and the description was published in Eremophila and Allied Genera: A Monograph of the Plant Family Myoporaceae. The specific epithet is from the Latin flabellata, 'fan-shaped', referring  to the shape of the sepals of this species.

Distribution and habitat
This eremophila often occurs in mulga woodland, growing in red-brown clay loam in the Meekatharra and Wiluna districts of the Murchison biogeographic region.

Conservation status
Eremophila flabellata is classified as "not threatened" by the Western Australian Government Department of Parks and Wildlife.

Use in horticulture
This eremophila has not often been grown in gardens but has interesting, serrated leaves and colourful flowers. It is difficult to propagate from seed or from cuttings and is one of the few of its genus that will not graft onto Myoporum rootstock. It prefers well-drained soil in a sunny location and tolerates light frosts.

References

flabellata
Eudicots of Western Australia
Plants described in 2007
Endemic flora of Western Australia
Taxa named by Robert Chinnock